Thomas Quinn may refer to:
Thomas Quinn (author) (born 1951), author of historical novels
Thomas Quinn (MP) (1838–1897), Irish Nationalist politician and builder
T. Vincent Quinn (1903–1982), U.S. Representative from New York

See also
Tom Quinn (disambiguation)